Kord Kandi (also Romanized as Kord Kandī) is a village in Marhemetabad-e Miyani Rural District, Marhemetabad District, Miandoab County, West Azerbaijan Province, Iran. At the 2006 census, its population was 333, in 69 families.

References 

Populated places in Miandoab County